havoc, Havoc, Havocs, Havok, or Havock may also refer to:

People with the name
 Havoc (musician) (born 1974), American rapper and record producer
 Johnny Devine (born 1974), Canadian professional wrestler who uses the ring name Havok 
 Jimmy Havoc (born 1984), ring name of a British professional wrestler
 June Havoc (1912–2010), Canadian-American actress, vaudeville performer, and memoirist 
 Mikey Havoc (born 1970), New Zealand media personality 
 Davey Havok (born 1975), American rock vocalist 
 Jessicka Havok (born 1986), American professional wrestler 
 Havoc Pennington (born c. 1976), American computer engineer and entrepreneur
 Havoc, member of the West Coast rap group South Central Cartel

Arts, entertainment, and media

Fictional characters
 Havoc, alias Carmine, a character in the Japanese anime television series Darker than Black
 General Havoc, a villain in the Power Rangers Turbo television series
 Jean Havoc, a character in the manga and anime series Fullmetal Alchemist
 Havok (comics), a Marvel Comics superhero
 Lord Havok, a DC Comics supervillain
 Captain Nick "Havoc" Parker, a fictional character in the Command & Conquer: Renegade video game

Films
 Havoc (1925 film), an American film
 Havoc (1972 film), a German film
 Havoc (2005 film), an American film
 Havoc (2023 film), an American film

Literature
 Havoc, a book by Ann Aguirre, 2014
 Havoc, a book by Jack Du Brul, 2006
 Havoc, a novel by the Danish writer Tom Kristensen (poet), 1930
 Havoc, a book by E. Phillips Oppenheim, 1911
 Havoc, book 2 of the Malice series by Chris Wooding, 2010

Games and toys
 Havoc (video game), a 1995 first-person shooter
 Havoc, a wargame produced by Bluebird Toys
 H.A.V.O.C. (Heavy Articulated Vehicle Ordnance Carrier), a vehicle in the G.I. Joe: A Real American Hero toyline

Music
 Havoc (album), a 2016 album by Circus Maximus
 Havok (band), an American thrash metal band
 "Havoc", a song by Alanis Morissette from Havoc and Bright Lights (2012)

Brands and enterprises
 Havoc, the online product name of methylepitiostanol, a designer steroid
 Havoc, an English agency for stunt performers in the 1960s/1970s run by Derek Ware
 Havok (company), an Irish company that develops Havok software
 Havok (software), a physics engine for video games

Military
 Douglas A-20 Havoc, a light bomber aircraft
 , a class of torpedo boat destroyer in the British Royal Navy
 , the name of several British Royal Navy ships
 Mil Mi-28, a Russian attack helicopter (NATO reporting name: Havoc)

Sports
 Havoc, a philosophy and style of play used by the VCU Rams men's basketball team
 Huntsville Havoc, a professional ice hockey team in the Southern Professional Hockey League, based in Huntsville, Alabama

Other uses
 High Altitude Venus Operational Concept, a proposed NASA study

See also